Four Afghan Steeds (Chinese: 爱乌罕四骏图) is a series of four portraits of Afghan horses donated to Emperor Qianlong of China in 1763 by Emir Ahmad Shah of Afghanistan, and painted on a silk roll by the Milanese Jesuit missionary Giuseppe Castiglione. These paintings, commissioned shortly before Castiglione's death, present detailed information about each of the horses, in four languages: Uyghur, Chinese, Manchurian and Mongolian. It is considered one of Castiglione's most famous works and are now kept at the National Palace Museum in Taiwan (40.7 x 297.1 cm) along with other art featuring horses by Castiglione.

Context
The Afghan state at the time (the Durrani Empire) was southwest of Badakhshan which constituted the westernmost vassal state in the Muslim confines of the Qing Empire. During the twelfth lunar month to the 28th year of the reign of Emperor Qianlong (1763) the Afghan Emir Ahmad Shah Abdali paid tribute by sending four excellent horses. He also sent an emissary to Peking to present him with a diplomatic certificate in gold leaf containing information about this donation of purebred horses. Qianlong also composed a song about these "Four Afghan Couriers". However, the Afghans failed to make a good impression to Qianlong as they refused to perform a kowtow. The event came during uneasy Sino-Afghan relations and threats of war regarding Qing's expansion into Turkic Central Asia.

Afterwards, Emperor Qianlong commissioned Castiglione, who was 74, the portrait of the four horses that Durrani Afghans had just given him. It is possible that the emperor was inspired by the Five Horses painting by Li Gonglin. This is one of Castiglione's last works, and his last known portrait of horses.

Description
The paintings of Giuseppe Castiglione show the bodies of horses in full, their manes being of a different color from the body. He represented them from different angles, suggesting movement through the lifting of the limbs. He also indicated a light source to attenuate the tints, and thus give the horses a volumetric effect.

The horses represented are of a finer, more dashing and less round model than those of the Castiglione's Ten Couriers.

These paintings feature inscriptions in Chinese, Manchurian, Mongolian and Uyghur, indicating the name, height and length of the horses. Taken individually, these inscriptions seem to be just translations of one another.

Chaoercong

The horse, which is the first to appear when it is unrolled, walks to the right and is a gray horse.

Laiyuanliu

This horse is shown three-quarter back, facing to the right, and wearing a burnt chestnut robe.

Yuekulai

This horse walking to the left is depicted in yellow color, possibly a palomino coat.

The name of the horse, Yuekulai, has been the subject of interpretations and translations. Yueku is used in classical Chinese texts to designate the location of the moon or the light of the moon. Lai designates a horse seven chi tall.

The Manchurian inscription is argatu sirha; argatu denotes a stag or male roe deer, and sirha is a variant of sirga, denoting a color of reddish-brown in horses and deer. The reference to deer is probably to be understood as a reference to the male's pale coat color. The word sirga seems to refer to a light color.

Lingkunbai

Represented from the front, this horse has a gray coat.

Analysis
The horses represented do not have an identifiable sex, which a contemporary French author attributed to the modesty of Castiglione, who received a Jesuit education. The hair and the bottom of the limbs of these horses appear to be dyed with henna, consistent with Afghan, Indian and Persian tradition.

Comparison to One Hundred Horses (1728)

Notes and references

Bibliography

.

Chinese paintings
Horses in art
Afghanistan–China relations